Elizabeth Catherine Bagshaw  (October 19, 1881 – January 5, 1982) was one of Canada's first woman physicians. She was the medical director of the first birth control clinic in Canada, located in Hamilton, Ontario.

Early life

Bagshaw was born on a farm in Mariposa Township, Victoria County, Ontario, the youngest of four daughters of John and Eliza Bagshaw. Bagshaw's sister, Annie, remarked that from a young age she had a brilliant memory, and school work came easily for her. Her father died in July 1904 in a farm accident, which left Bagshaw in charge of the family farm which spanned 89 hectares. By the first week of October 1904, Bagshaw sold the farm, and moved both her mother and a sister with her to Toronto to finish her final year of medical school.

Education

Bagshaw registered at the University of Toronto in September 1901 as an occasional student; this enabled her to obtain a degree from this university while taking most of her courses at the neighbouring Ontario Medical College for Women, which would later become Women's College Hospital. Here she gained practical experience seeing prenatal patients at a maternity clinic. In 1905 Elizabeth became Doctor Bagshaw and graduated from the University of Toronto. After graduation, Bagshaw apprenticed under Emma Leila Skinner who was an 1896 graduate of the University of Toronto. There she learned of maternity work, and the economic struggles patients often had in affording and seeing a doctor.

Career

After working in Hamilton, Ontario for the summer of 1906, Bagshaw moved to that city and set up her own medical practice. During the Spanish flu epidemic, Bagshaw had approximately 25–30 maternity cases per month. 

In 1934, Bagshaw entered politics, seeking to fill the Ward 1 aldermanic seat being vacated by Nora-Frances Henderson, one of Hamilton's first elected female local politicians who sought election to the city's Board of Control. Despite a strong campaign, Bagshaw placed third, a loss the Hamilton Spectator attributed to her running against the area's long-serving school trustee, Orville Walsh.

From 1932 until 1966, Bagshaw was the medical director of Canada's first birth control clinic. Over the course of her career she delivered thousands of babies, including one delivered by the light of kerosene lamps from her car. She retired at the age of 95 in 1976, the oldest practicing physician in Canada at the time. She became a centenarian in 1981.

Personal life
Shortly before World War I, Bagshaw met Lou Honey, a Canadian soldier, who was killed shortly after enlisting in 1915. She also corresponded with a man named Jimmie Dickinson while at the University of Toronto and kept in touch with him for years after their graduation in 1905. At the time of the Spanish flu epidemic he was living in Western Canada, contracted Spanish flu, developed pneumonia and died. In 1921, nearing her 40th birthday, Bagshaw began a friendship with Rocco Perri, a man known as the king of bootleggers.

Bagshaw attended church her whole life and belonged to a temperance organization; however, she had a tendency to become involved with law-breakers. During this same period, in February 1926, she received a phone call telling her that her second cousin, Bernice, was ill. When Bernice died, Bagshaw cared for her son, John. At the age of 45 she adopted him, calling her lawyer and avoiding Children's Aid completely, reasoning that "they would never give a child to an unmarried woman." Both her son, and her daughter-in-law would eventually become doctors and work in the same office she started in Hamilton.

Dr. Bagshaw was an avid golfer, and a charter member of Glendale Golf & Country Club when it was founded in 1919. Dr. Bagshaw's son John, in a note to the golf club, said that he had only seen his mother cry twice in her life. The first time was when her beloved Glendale's original clubhouse burned to the ground in 1936.

Awards and distinctions

In 1970, she was awarded Hamilton's Citizen of the Year. On April 11, 1973, Bagshaw was invested as a Member of the Order of Canada. In 1978, the National Film Board of Canada produced a film about her called Doctor Woman: The Life and Times of Dr. Elizabeth Bagshaw. In 1979, she was one of the first seven women to receive the Governor General's Awards in Commemoration of the Persons Case "to recognize outstanding contributions to the quality of life of women in Canada". In 2007, she was inducted into the Canadian Medical Hall of Fame. The Elizabeth Bagshaw Elementary School in Hamilton is named in her honour as is the Elizabeth Bagshaw Women's Clinic in Vancouver, British Columbia.

References

1881 births
1982 deaths
Canadian centenarians
Canadian obstetricians
History of women in Canada
University of Toronto alumni
Members of the Order of Canada
People from Kawartha Lakes
Physicians from Ontario
Governor General's Award in Commemoration of the Persons Case winners
Women centenarians